Oscar Ivar Öhman (19 January 1914 – 25 August 1989) was a Swedish journalist and diplomat. He served as Ambassador of Sweden to Greece from 1976 to 1980.

Early life
Öhman was born on 19 January 1914 in Timrå, Sweden, the son of Oscar Öhman, an editor, and his wife Elvira (née Näslund).

Career
Öhman was a contributor to Norrlands-Kuriren from 1931 to 1934 and published Unga Röster between 1932 and 1934. He was editorial secretary at Folket i Bild in 1934 and editor-in-chief there from 1946 to 1962, and for Utflykt in 1962. Öhman served as a press attaché at the Swedish embassy in Oslo with position as counsellor in 1963 and as press counsellor in 1970. He served as ambassador in Athens from 1976 to 1980.

Personal life and death
In 1940, Öhman married Ingrid Rollvén (born 1915), the daughter of Hjalmar Rollvén and Ester (née Trolin). In 1952, he married Birgit Koch (born 1924), the daughter of Rolf Koch and Sally (née Trolin).

Öhman died on 25 August 1989 in Gustav Vasa Parish, Stockholm. He was interred at Norra begravningsplatsen in Solna Municipality on 3 October 1989.

Awards
Illis quorum, 12th size (1984)

Selected bibliography

References

1914 births
1989 deaths
Ambassadors of Sweden to Greece
People from Timrå Municipality
Swedish newspaper editors
Burials at Norra begravningsplatsen
Recipients of the Illis quorum